Nagalingam Shanmugalingam is a Sri Lankan Tamil sociologist, academic and former vice-chancellor of the University of Jaffna.

Early life
Shanmugalingam obtained a BEd degree from the University of Colombo. He later received MA and PhD degrees from the University of Jaffna.

Career
Shanmugalingam joined the University of Jaffna in 1981 as an assistant lecturer in sociology and eventually became professor of sociology. He was later head of the Department of Sociology and Political Science at the university. He was appointed vice-chancellor of the university in December 2007. Shanmugalingam stood for re-election but in March 2011 President Mahinda Rajapaksa appointed Vasanthy Arasaratnam to the post of vice-chancellor.

References

Academic staff of the University of Jaffna
Alumni of the University of Colombo
Alumni of the University of Jaffna
Living people
Sri Lankan Tamil academics
Sri Lankan Tamil sociologists
Sri Lankan Tamil writers
Vice-Chancellors of the University of Jaffna
Year of birth missing (living people)